Papazoglou (Greek: Παπάζογλου) is a Greek surname. The name comes from the Greek papas (priest) and Turkish oglou (oğlu - son), literally meaning priest's son. Notable people with this surname include:

Men 
Athanasios Papazoglou (born 1988), Greek footballer
Leonidas Papazoglou (1872-1918), Greek photographer 
Michalis Papazoglou, Greek member of World War II resistance
Nikos Papazoglou (1948-2011), Greek songwriter and singer
Panagiotis Papazoglou, Greek mathematician (in his papers under the name Panos Papasoglu)
Christopher Ryan (born 1950) (Born Christopher Papazoglou), British actor

Women 
Orania Papazoglou (1951-2019), real name of American writer Jane Haddam

Greek-language surnames
Surnames
Occupational surnames